William Carlton (22 May 1876 – 23 December 1959) was an Australian cricketer. He played first-class cricket for Victoria, Auckland and Canterbury between 1898 and 1914.

In 1909 the Australian Test player Hugh Trumble, having been asked by the Canterbury Cricket Association to find a coach, chose Carlton. As well as being an accomplished cricketer, Carlton was also a baseball and football player and a sprinter. He remained with Canterbury for three seasons before returning to Melbourne. He was one of the leading batsmen in New Zealand in 1909-10, with 238 runs in four matches at an average of 39.66 and a highest score of 88 not out, the highest score of the match, for Canterbury against Auckland in the Plunket Shield.

See also
 List of Victoria first-class cricketers
 List of Auckland representative cricketers

References

External links
 

1876 births
1959 deaths
Australian cricketers
Australian cricket coaches
Auckland cricketers
Canterbury cricketers
Victoria cricketers
Cricketers from Melbourne